Jesse Lee may refer to:

Jesse Lee (Methodist) (1758–1816), American Methodist Episcopal clergyman and pioneer
Jesse Lee (politician) (born 1979), White House Online Programs Director under the Barack Obama Administration
Jesse Lee (singer) (born 1987), American country music artist
Jesse Lee, a gunslinger played by Mario Van Peebles in the 1993 film Posse
Jesse Lee Soffer (born 1984), American actor sometimes credited as "Jesse Lee"

See also

Jessica Lee (disambiguation)
Jessie Lee (disambiguation)
Jess Lee (disambiguation)